The 2008 WNBA season was the 11th for the Detroit Shock, an American women's professional basketball team. The Shock attempted to return to the WNBA Finals for the third consecutive year. They won the WNBA Finals for the third time in franchise history. During the finals, Katie Smith averaged a team high 21.7 points per game to be named WNBA Finals MVP. Similar to Kevin Garnett with the 2008 Boston Celtics, Taj McWilliams-Franklin won her first championship after 10 years in the league.

Offseason
The following player was lost in the Atlanta Dream expansion draft:
 Katie Feenstra

WNBA Draft

Transactions
September 4: The Shock signed Ashley Shields.
August 19: The Shock signed Ashley Shields to a seven-day contract.
August 12: The Shock traded Tasha Humphrey, Eshaya Murphy and a second-round pick in the 2009 WNBA Draft to the Washington Mystics for Taj McWilliams-Franklin.
August 8: The Shock waived Stacey Lovelace.
July 26: The Shock signed Kelly Schumacher.
July 25: The Shock waived Nancy Lieberman.
July 24: The Shock signed Nancy Lieberman to a seven-day contract.
July 11: The Shock signed Stacey Lovelace.
June 27: The Shock waived Chrissy Givens.
June 22: The Shock traded LaToya Thomas to the Minnesota Lynx for Eshaya Murphy.
June 18: The Shock waived Wanisha Smith and signed Chrissy Givens.
May 15: The Shock waived Michelle Campbell and Wanisha Smith.
May 8: The Shock signed Wanisha Smith to a training camp contract.
May 7: The Shock signed free agent Sheri Sam.
May 5: The Shock waived Valeriya Berezhynska, Natasha Lacy and Tyresa Smith.
April 26: The Shock waived Chakhia Cole, Fantasia Goodwin and Samantha Mahoney.
April 18: The Shock waived Nina Norman.
April 17: The Shock signed Samantha Mahoney to a training camp contract.
April 16: The Shock signed Chakhia Cole to a training camp contract.
March 31: The Shock signed Elaine Powell to a training camp contract.
March 10: The Shock re-signed free agents Cheryl Ford, Deanna Nolan and Katie Smith.
March 4: The Shock signed Tyresa Smith and Michelle Campbell to training camp contracts.
February 29: The Shock signed Nina Norman to a training camp contract.
February 28: The Shock re-signed free agent Plenette Pierson and signed Chrissy Givens to a training camp contract.
February 19: The Shock traded Swin Cash to the Seattle Storm in exchange for the 4th pick in the 2008 WNBA Draft.
February 6: The Shock traded Ivory Latta to the Atlanta Dream in exchange for LaToya Thomas and the 18th pick in the 2008 WNBA Draft.

Trades

Free agents

Additions

Subtractions

Season Highlights
The Shock season opener resulted in a record-breaking debut for rookie guard Alexis Hornbuckle. Hornbuckle set a Shock record with seven steals to help the Shock beat the Houston Comets on May 17. Deanna Nolan scored a franchise-record 44 points (28 in the fourth quarter and overtime) in a 98-93 victory over the Minnesota Lynx on June 20.

Malice at the Palace

The Sparks–Shock brawl (also known as The Malice at the Palace II) was an altercation that occurred in a game between the Detroit Shock and Los Angeles Sparks on July 21, 2008 at The Palace of Auburn Hills. With 4.2 seconds before the game was officially over, the fighting began on the court after Plenette Pierson made a hard block out after a free throw on Candace Parker. This was the second brawl to occur at the Palace, the other being the Pacers–Pistons brawl.

Nancy Lieberman
In July, the Detroit Shock signed Nancy Lieberman to a 7-day contract. The 50-year-old Lieberman broke her own record for being the oldest player in the WNBA. Lieberman, a Hall of Famer since 1999, was 39 years old when she played with Phoenix during the league's first year in 1997.

The 50-year-old Lieberman played nine minutes and had two assists. One of the assists included a no-look pass in the closing minutes of the Detroit Shock's 79-61 loss to the Houston Comets on July 24.

Lieberman made a one-time only appearance in the Shock's first game due to  a bench-clearing melee with the Los Angeles Sparks on July 22. Five Shock players were suspended and Cheryl Ford suffered a season-ending injury, prompting coach Bill Laimbeer to offer Lieberman a seven-day contract.

Roster

Season standings

Schedule

Regular season

|- bgcolor="#bbffbb"
| 1
|  May 17
|  Houston
| 85-66
| Smith (21)
| Ford (11)
| Ford (4)
| Palace of Auburn Hills13,824
| 1-0
|- bgcolor="ffbbbb"
| 2
| May 18
| @ Minnesota
| 70-84
| Smith (17)
| Ford (9)
| Nolan (6)
| Target Center9,972
| 1-1
|- bgcolor="bbffbb"
| 3
| May 21
| Indiana
| 76-71
| Braxton (22)
| Ford (10)
| Nolan (8)
| Palace of Auburn Hills6,842
| 2-1
|- bgcolor="bbffbb"
| 4
| May 23
| @ Atlanta
| 88-76
| Nolan (33)
| Ford (13)
| Nolan (8)
| Philips Arena11,609
| 3-1
|- bgcolor="bbffbb"
| 5
| May 25
| New York
| 72-62
| Pierson (25)
| Braxton, Powell (7)
| Nolan (7)
| Palace of Auburn Hills8,068
| 4-1
|- bgcolor="bbffbb"
| 6
| May 31
| @ Indiana
| 74-65
| Smith (19)
| Ford (8)
| Nolan, Powell (3)
| Conseco Fieldhouse9,219
| 5-1
|-

|- bgcolor="bbffbb"
| 7
| June 4
| Seattle
| 77-67
| Smith (33)
| Ford (11)
| Nolan (8)
| Palace of Auburn Hills8,108
| 6-1
|- bgcolor="bbffbb"
| 8
| June 6
| @ Sacramento
| 84-70
| Smith (30)
| Braxton, Ford, Nolan (6)
| Nolan (9)
| ARCO Arena6,663
| 7-1
|- bgcolor="ffbbbb"
| 9
| June 7
| @ Seattle
| 67-75
| Smith (18)
| Pierson (10)
| Hornbuckle, Pierson (3)
| KeyArena7,105
| 7-2
|- bgcolor="ffbbbb"
| 10
| June 11
| @ Los Angeles
| 73-80
| Smith (16)
| Pierson, Smith (7)
| Smith (4)
| STAPLES Center8,520
| 7-3
|- bgcolor="bbffbb"
| 11
| June 14
| @ Phoenix
| 89-79
| Humphrey (28)
| Hornbuckle (15)
| Nolan (8)
| US Airways Center7,696
| 8-3
|- bgcolor="bbffbb"
| 12
| June 20
| Minnesota
| 98-93 (OT)
| Nolan (44)
| Ford (14)
| Pierson (4)
| Palace of Auburn Hills8,916
| 9-3
|- bgcolor="bbffbb"
| 13
| June 22
| @ Atlanta
| 97-76
| Ford (20)
| Ford (12)
| Nolan (7)
| Philips Arena7,865
| 10-3
|- bgcolor="ffbbbb"
| 14
| June 24
| @ Connecticut
| 68-85
| Nolan (17)
| Ford (11)
| Smith (4)
| Mohegan Sun Arena7,501
| 10-4
|- bgcolor="bbffbb"
| 15
| June 26
| Connecticut
| 70-61
| Nolan (13)
| Ford (9)
| Smith (4)
| Palace of Auburn Hills8,636
| 11-4
|- bgcolor="ffbbbb"
| 16
| June 28
| @ Chicago
| 59-76
| Murphy (13)
| Ford (8)
| Hornbuckle, Sam (4)
| UIC Pavilion3,407
| 11-5
|- bgcolor="bbffbb"
| 17
| June 29
| Atlanta
| 100-92
| Braxton (26)
| Braxton (9)
| Nolan (11)
| Palace of Auburn Hills8,798
| 12-5
|-

|- bgcolor="ffbbbb"
| 18
| July 1
| @ San Antonio
| 72-79 (OT)
| Smith (17)
| Ford, Sam (8)
| Smith (9)
| AT&T Center5,656
| 12-6
|- bgcolor="bbffbb"
| 19
| July 8
| Connecticut
| 88-82
| Pierson (23)
| Braxton (8)
| Nolan (8)
| Palace of Auburn Hills7,623
| 13-6
|- bgcolor="bbffbb"
| 20
| July 11
| Washington
| 79-66
| Smith (23)
| Braxton, Ford (7)
| Nolan (4)
| Palace of Auburn Hills8,596
| 14-6
|- bgcolor="ffbbbb"
| 21
| July 12
| @ New York
| 64-74
| Smith, Pierson (13)
| Ford (12)
| Nolan (4)
| Madison Square Garden8,661
| 14-7
|- bgcolor="bbffbb"
| 22
| July 16
| Chicago
| 66-63
| Ford (14)
| Pierson (8)
| Nolan, Smith (4)
| Palace of Auburn Hills15,210
| 15-7
|- bgcolor="bbffbb"
| 23
| July 18
| @ Washington
| 99-62
| Nolan (26)
| Braxton, Hornbuckle (6)
| Sam (8)
| Verizon Center6,834
| 16-7
|- bgcolor="ffbbbb"
| 24
| July 20
| Sacramento
| 85-88
| Nolan (27)
| Ford (10)
| Smith (6)
| Palace of Auburn Hills9,138
| 16-8
|- bgcolor="ffbbbb"
| 25
| July 22
| Los Angeles
| 81-84
| Smith (20)
| Ford (9)
| Hornbuckle, Smith (5)
| Palace of Auburn Hills12,930
| 16-9
|- bgcolor="ffbbbb"
| 26
| July 24
| @ Houston
| 61-79
| Nolan (23)
| Nolan, Sam (9)
| Nolan (4)
| Reliant Arena7,261
| 16-10
|- bgcolor="ffbbbb"
| 27
| July 27
| San Antonio
| 64-76
| Nolan (25)
| Braxton (9)
| Smith (6)
| Palace of Auburn Hills9,537
| 16-11
|-

|-
| colspan="10" align="center" valign="middle" | Summer Olympic break
|- bgcolor="bbffbb"
| 28
| August 29
| New York
| 83-69
| Nolan (26)
| Braxton, McWilliams-Franklin (7)
| Smith (6)
| Palace of Auburn Hills11,516
| 17-11
|- bgcolor="ffbbbb"
| 29
| August 31
| @ Chicago
| 81-82 (OT)
| Smith (23)
| McWilliams-Franklin (11)
| Nolan (6)
| UIC Pavilion4,197
| 17-12
|-

|- bgcolor="bbffbb"
| 30
| September 5
| Indiana
| 90-68
| Pierson (20)
| Pierson (6)
| McWilliams-Franklin, Pierson (4)
| Palace of Auburn Hills9,287
| 18-12
|- bgcolor="bbffbb"
| 31
| September 6
| @ Washington
| 84-69
| McWilliams-Franklin (21)
| Nolan (10)
| Smith (8)
| Verizon Center9,976
| 19-12
|- bgcolor="bbffbb"
| 32
| September 9
| Phoenix
| 89-78
| Nolan (18)
| Braxton, Hornbuckle, McWilliams-Franklin (8)
| Pierson, Smith (5)
| Palace of Auburn Hills7,495
| 20-12
|- bgcolor="bbffbb"
| 33
| September 11
| Washington
| 78-66
| Nolan (17)
| McWilliams-Franklin (8)
| Smith (6)
| Palace of Auburn Hills8,145
| 21-12
|- bgcolor="bbffbb"
| 34
| September 14
| @ New York
| 61-59
| Nolan, Pierson (11)
| Hornbuckle, Nolan (7)
| Powell (4)
| Madison Square Garden10,042
| 22-12
|-

Postseason

|- bgcolor="bbffbb"
| 1
| September 19
| @ Indiana
| 81-72
| Nolan (22)
| Braxton, McWilliams-Franklin (7)
| Powell, Smith (3)
| Conseco Fieldhouse7,613
| 1-0
|- bgcolor="ffbbbb"
| 2
| September 21
| Indiana
| 82-89
| Nolan, Pierson (16)
| Pierson, Powell (7)
| Pierson (5)
| Palace of Auburn Hills8,219
| 1-1
|-bgcolor="bbffbb"
| 3
| September 23
| Indiana
| 80-61
| Nolan (21)
| Hornbuckle (8)
| Hornbuckle, McWilliams-Franklin (4)
| Palace of Auburn Hills8,296
| 2-1
|-

|- bgcolor="bbffbb"
| 1
| September 26
| @ New York
| 56-60
| Nolan (22)
| Hornbuckle, McWilliams-Franklin (7)
| 4 players (2)
| Madison Square Garden14,711
| 1-0
|-bgcolor="ffbbbb"
| 2
| September 28
| New York
| 64-55
| Nolan (22)
| Taj McWilliams-Franklin (11)
| 4 players (2)
| EMU Convocation Center7,965
| 1-1
|- bgcolor="bbffbb"
| 3
| September 29
| New York
| 75-73
| Nolan (21)
| Taj McWilliams-Franklin (8)
| Nolan, Smith (3)
| EMU Convocation Center7,429
| 2-1
|-

|-bgcolor="bbffbb"
| 1
| October 1
| @ San Antonio
| 77-69
| Smith (25)
| Smith (9)
| Nolan (4)
| AT&T Center9,380
| 1-0
|-bgcolor="bbffbb"
| 2
| October 3
| @ San Antonio
| 69-61
| Smith (22)
| Nolan (7)
| Smith (6)
| AT&T Center16,012
| 2-0
|-bgcolor="bbffbb"
| 3
| October 5
| San Antonio
| 76-60
| Smith (18)
| Braxton, Hornbuckle (9)
| Hornbuckle, Nolan (5)
| EMU Convocation Center8,952
| 3-0
|-

Player stats

Regular season

Detroit Shock Regular Season Stats

Postseason

Detroit Shock Playoff Stats

Awards and honors
 Katie Smith, WNBA Player of the Week (June 2–8)
 Deanna Nolan, WNBA Player of the Week (June 16–22 and July 14–20)
 Deanna Nolan, All-WNBA Defensive Second Team
 Katie Smith, All-WNBA Defensive Second Team
 Deanna Nolan, All-WNBA Second Team
 Katie Smith, WNBA Finals MVP

References

External links

Detroit Shock seasons
Detroit
Eastern Conference (WNBA) championship seasons
Women's National Basketball Association championship seasons
Detroit Shock